Marit Stiles  (born September 20, 1969) is a Canadian politician who has been the leader of the Ontario New Democratic Party (NDP) and the leader of the Opposition since February 4, 2023. She has represented Davenport in the Legislative Assembly of Ontario since June 7, 2018.

Born in Newfoundland, Stiles moved to Ontario to attend university. She worked as a policy researcher before becoming research and policy director with ACTRA.  Stiles served as a Toronto District School Board (TDSB) trustee in 2014 and was the president of the federal NDP from 2016 to 2018, before her election as a member of Provincial Parliament (MPP).

Early life and career 
Stiles was born on September 20, 1969, in St. John's, Newfoundland, growing up in the communities of Long Pond and Logy Bay. Her parents were Americans who had moved from Pennsylvania to Newfoundland in 1967 and settled on a small farm outside St John's. Her father was an anthropology professor at Memorial University.

The name Marit is of Norwegian origin. She does not have Norwegian ancestry, the name came from family friends who were Norwegian. She has a sister named Enid who is a veterinarian outside of Montreal.

In 1988, Stiles moved to Ontario to attend university. Her first political involvement was in 1990 when she canvassed for Evelyn Gigantes along with her future partner Jordan Berger. After graduating with a Bachelor of Arts (BA) in political science from Carleton University in 1992, she worked in the office of Timmins MPP Gilles Bisson. She worked for the Canadian Policy Research Networks in 1995 and as a researcher for the federal NDP's Ontario caucus from 1998 to 2004. Stiles went to work for ACTRA in 2005, where she was the director of research, public policy and communications.

Political career

Stiles served as a trustee for the Toronto District School Board from 2014 until 2018, and was the president of the federal New Democratic Party from 2016 to 2018.

Member of Provincial Parliament 
Contesting Davenport for the provincial NDP in the 2018 Ontario election, Stiles ran against Liberal incumbent Cristina Martins, who faced criticism for her government's handling of the handling of the Davenport Diamond rail overpass. Stiles campaigned for the electrification of the nearby GO Transit line and ensuring all “amenities” associated with the Davenport Diamond rail bridge are completed. She defeated Martins, becoming the riding's second NDP MPP.

Stiles was the party's education critic from 2018 to 2022.

NDP leadership 
Following the 2022 provincial election, the NDP remained in opposition and party leader Andrea Horwath stepped down. MPP Peter Tabuns became interim leader until the party could hold a leadership election in 2023. Stiles announced that she would run for NDP leader on September 22, 2022. During her campaign, she received endorsements from eight fellow MPPs.

During her campaign, Stiles outlined five priorities for the NDP and the province. She ran on climate action by creating jobs in sustainable industries and investing in green infrastructure. She called for "true reconciliation" by protecting Indigenous rights and addressing issues such as clean drinking water, treatment in the justice system and shelter. Labour was another one of her priorities, and she has stated that she would like to focus on creating jobs where workers' rights and safety are respected. Another commitment was reforming the province's electoral system and moving away from first-past-the-post. Stiles has also criticized what she perceives as the Conservative's efforts to increase privatization of government services, and committed to improving public education, healthcare, and social security.

The NDP announced on December 5, 2022, that Stiles was set to become leader. While several other MPPs had explored running for leader, none were able to meet the entry requirements—which included raising a $55,000 fee—before the December 5 deadline. The official confirmation vote was scheduled for March 4, 2023, but the party's provincial council voted to move the date up to February 4. Premier Doug Ford congratulated Stiles in a brief statement posted to Twitter stating "I'm looking forward to many spirited debates as we both strive to make Ontario the best place to live, work and raise a family."

Stiles was formally confirmed on February 4, 2023, taking office as leader of the NDP and becoming the leader of the Official Opposition in Ontario.

Personal life 
Stiles lives in Toronto with her husband Jordan Berger and their two daughters. Berger ran for the NDP in Davenport in 2003.

Election record

References

External links
 Marit Stiles
 

1969 births
Ontario New Democratic Party MPPs
21st-century Canadian politicians
21st-century Canadian women politicians
Living people
Canadian people of American descent
Women MPPs in Ontario
Toronto District School Board trustees
Presidents of the New Democratic Party of Canada
Politicians from St. John's, Newfoundland and Labrador
Politicians from Toronto
Leaders of the Ontario New Democratic Party
Female Canadian political party leaders